Garmond may refer to:

Warmund, Patriarch of Jerusalem (bef. 1069 – 1128)
Garmond, Aberdeenshire, Scotland
10 pt size of metal type, named after Claude Garamond

See also
 Garamond (disambiguation)